This was the first edition of the event.

Nicha Lertpitaksinchai and Peangtarn Plipuech won the title, defeating Erika Sema and Yurika Sema in the final, 7–6(7–5), 6–3.

Seeds

Draw

Draw

References 
 Main Draw

2014 ITF Women's Circuit
2014 in Indian tennis